Kuruçeşme is a neighborhood in Beşiktaş ilçe (district) of İstanbul, Turkey. It is on the European side of Bosphorous between the neighborhoods of Ortaköy and Arnavutköy.

Historically, the neighborhood was called by various names such as Bithias or Bythias, Kalamos, Amopolos, Bytharia. It was located in ancient Thrace and inhabited through Roman times. The present name refers to a historical fountain from the 15th century mosque built by Osman Efendi, the chief tezkire poet of Ottoman sultan Mehmed II (reigned 1444–1446, 1451–1481), and means literally the "Dried fountain".

The population of Kuruçeşme is 3,123. The popular concert venue Turkcell Kuruçeşme Arena was situated in Kuruçeşme, which is now the Mandarin Oriental Hotel due to open 2020. The Cemil Topuzlu Park in Kuruçeşme is the finish point of the annual Bosphorus Cross Continental Swim.

References

Neighbourhoods of Beşiktaş
Bosphorus